The 1963 Coppa Italia Final was the final of the 1962–63 Coppa Italia, played on 2 June 1963 between Atalanta and Torino. Atalanta won 3–1 for their first victory. It is the club's only major honour.

Atalanta's celebrations were limited as Pope John XXIII, also from Bergamo, died the following day.

Match

References 

Coppa Italia 1962/63 statistics at rsssf.com
 https://www.calcio.com/calendario/ita-coppa-italia-1962-1963-finale/2/
 https://www.worldfootball.net/schedule/ita-coppa-italia-1962-1963-finale/2/

Coppa Italia Final
Coppa Italia Finals
Coppa Italia Final 1963
Coppa Italia Final 1963
Coppa Italia Final